Fuling Wujiang Bridge is a cable-stayed bridge in Fuling, Chongqing, China. The bridge spans  over the Wu River very near its confluence with the Yangtze river. Completed in 2009 the bridge was the second over the Wu River in Fuling after the Fuling Arch Bridge that was completed in 1989. The bridge contains a partial cloverleaf interchange on the western side of the river.

References

Bridges in Chongqing
Bridges completed in 2009
Cable-stayed bridges in China